Bossiaea tasmanica is a species of flowering plant in the family Fabaceae and is endemic to Tasmania. It is a prostrate or low-lying shrub with spiny branches, elliptic to egg-shaped with the narrower end towards the base, and yellow and red to pink flowers.

Description

This bossiaea is closely related to B. obcordata, but differs from it in being more prostrate, and in having branchlets that are more wax-encrusted with blunter spines, narrower leaves and a hairy sepals and fruit.

Taxonomy
This species was first formally described in 1903 by Leonard Rodway who gave it the name  Bossiaea cinerea var. rigida in his book, The Tasmanian Flora from a specimens collected at "The Rocks, near New Norfolk". In 2012, Ian Thompson revised the genus, Bossiaea, and raised this taxon to species status. The name Bossiaea rigida was not available as it had already been used by Nikolai Turczaninow for a species now known as Bossiaea preissii. Thompson used the name Bossiaea tasmanica as this is the only endemic species of Bossiaea in Tasmania.

Distribution and habitat
Bossiaea tasmanica grows in forest and woodland in north-eastern Tasmania near Mathinna and in south-eastern Tasmania near Oatlands.

Conservation status
This bossiaea is listed as "rare" under the Threatened Species Protection Act 1995.

References 

tasmanica
Flora of Tasmania
Plants described in 1903